Lee Scott Lingamfelter (born March 27, 1951) is a retired American politician, soldier, and writer. He was a Republican member of the Virginia House of Delegates from 2002 to 2018, representing the 31st district in Fauquier and Prince William Counties.  Prior to his election, from 1973 to 2001, Lingamfelter was an officer in the United States Army, reaching the rank of Colonel.

After retiring from politics, Lingamfelter began writing about his military endeavors. In 2020, Lingamfelter published his first book, Desert Redleg: Artillery Warfare in the First Gulf War, describing the experience of the First Gulf War through the eyes of a Field Artillery redleg in the 1st Infantry Division Artillery (DIVARTY). He attempts to answer the question of whether the United States "got the job done" in its first sustained Middle Eastern conflict. In 2021, Lingamfelter began writing his second book on the U.S. role in UN Middle East peacekeeping. The book is due to be published in 2022.

Education and military career
Lingamfelter was raised in Richmond, Virginia where he attended public and parochial schools. He then attended the Virginia Military Institute (VMI) in Lexington Virginia where he earned a B.A. in history in 1973.  After graduating from VMI as a Distinguished Military Graduate (DMG), he was commissioned in the Regular Army of the United States and began a career as a Field Artilleryman.

In 1979, the Army awarded him a scholarship to the University of Virginia (UVA) where he earned a Master of Arts in Government and Foreign Affairs in 1981.  He rose to the rank of Colonel.  His last military assignment in the Army was as Military Assistant to the Director, Operational Test and Evaluation of the Office of the Secretary of Defense. He is a graduate of the U.S. Army Command and General Staff College (1985), the U.S. Armed Forces Staff College (redesigned the Joint Forces Staff College) (1989), and the U.S. Army War College (1997) where he served as class president. He retired after 28 years of active-duty service.

Among his awards and decorations are the Defense Superior Service Medal; two Legions of Merit; the Bronze Star Medal; two Defense Meritorious Service Medals; four Meritorious Service Medals; three Joint Service Commendation Medals; the Army Commendation Medal; the National Defense Service Medal with bronze service star; the Southwest Asia Service Medal with three bronze service stars; the Kuwait Liberation Medal (Saudi Arabia); the Kuwait Liberation Medal (Kuwait); and the United Nations Service Medal.

Political career

House of Delegates

Elections
In 2001, Lingamfelter successfully won election to the Virginia House of Delegates as a Republican, defeating Democratic candidate M.D. Krause. Lingamfelter was a Republican member of the Virginia House of Delegates from 2002 to 2018, representing the 31st district in Fauquier and Prince William Counties,. Lingamfelter lost his reelection bid on November 7, 2017, following a wave of Democratic victories across Virginia. Most recently, Lingamfelter was a member of Veterans for Youngkin that supported the election of Governor Glenn Youngkin in 2021. He also published two articles in support of Youngkin in the Washington Times.

Tenure
Lingamfelter was a former Chair of the Militia, Police, and Public Safety Committee. He also served as a Member of the House Appropriations Committee and the Education Committee. Lingamfelter was also the former Chair of the Subcommittee on Public Safety, as well as a Member of the Subcommittee on Compensation and Retirement, the Subcommittee on Elementary and Secondary Education, and the Subcommittee on General Government and Capital Outlay.

Lingamfelter also served on the Chesapeake Bay Commission and was also the co-chairman of the Legislative Sportsmen's Caucus, a bipartisan group of stakeholders that seeks to promote awareness of issues facing Virginia's outdoorsmen and sportsmen.

Awards

In 2000, Lingamfelter was named the Virginia Family Foundation Citizen of the Year. In 2007, he was named the Chesapeake Bay Legislator of the Year. In 2013, the National Rifle Association's NRA Civil Rights Defense Fund voted to award Lingamfelter with the Carter-Knight Award for his successful efforts to repeal Virginia's gun rationing (one-gun-per-month) law.

Candidate for Lieutenant Governor

In June 2012 Lingamfelter announced his candidacy for the Republican nomination for Lieutenant Governor in 2013. After losing in the convention, Lingamfelter threw his support behind Pete Snyder.

Election Results

Professional Experience 
Since retiring from the military, Lingamfelter has worked for the private sector focused on strategic planning in support of the senior leadership for the U.S. Missile Defense Agency in Washington, D.C. Additionally, he has worked in the emergency management and homeland security arena in support of federal agencies, states and localities. He is the Former President of the Commonwealth Homeland Security Foundation, Abrams Learning and Information Systems Incorporated and a former consultant for Computer Sciences Corporation.

Personal life
Lingamfelter is married to the former Shelley Glick of Bridgewater, Virginia.  They have three children and five grandchildren. Lingamfelter attends Christ our Lord Anglican Church in Woodbridge, Virginia. He is also a member of the Association of the United States Army, the Society of the 1st Division, and Veterans of Foreign Wars (VFW). Lingamfelter is also a regular contributor on political and national security commentary to the Washington Times as well as other journals.

References

External links
 Delegate L. Scott Lingamfelter, Virginia General Assembly
 Virginia Public Access Project: L. Scott Lingamfelter
 2012 legislative session
 

1951 births
Living people
Republican Party members of the Virginia House of Delegates
Virginia Military Institute alumni
University of Virginia alumni
People from Woodbridge, Virginia
United States Army officers
American Anglican Church in North America members
Politicians from New York City
Recipients of the Legion of Merit
21st-century American politicians